Bert Blyleven (born Rik Aalbert Blijleven, April 6, 1951) is a Dutch-American former professional baseball pitcher who played 22 seasons in Major League Baseball (MLB) from 1970 to 1992, primarily with the Minnesota Twins. Blyleven recorded 3,701 career strikeouts, the fifth-most in MLB history. He won 287 games, 27th-most all-time, and pitched 4,970 innings, 14th-most all-time. A renowned curveball pitcher, Blyleven was also a two-time All-Star and World Series champion. Although under-appreciated during his playing career, he was inducted into the Baseball Hall of Fame in 2011—his second-to-last year of eligibility.

Blyleven made his major league debut at age 19 for the Twins. In the middle of the 1976 season, he was traded to the Texas Rangers, where he threw a no-hitter in his final start for the team. He won his first World Series with the Pittsburgh Pirates in 1979. Upon being traded to the Cleveland Indians, Blyleven initially struggled with injuries, but then enjoyed a late-career resurgence, finishing third in the Cy Young Award voting in back-to-back years, with Cleveland in 1984 and also the following 1985 season that he split between the Indians and Twins. It was during this second stint with Minnesota that Blyleven became the tenth member of the 3,000-strikeout club in 1986 and won a second World Series title in 1987. He played three seasons for the California Angels before retiring.

Blyleven became the first Dutch-born player to earn induction into the Baseball Hall of Fame. He serves as the pitching coach for the Netherlands national baseball team, having done so in the 2009, 2013 and 2017 and 2023 World Baseball Classic. From 1996 to 2020, he was a color analyst for Minnesota Twins television broadcasts.

Early life
Rik Aalbert Blyleven was born in Zeist, a municipality in Utrecht, Netherlands, the son of Johannes Cornelius and Jannigje Blijleven. His family moved to Melville, Saskatchewan, when Blyleven was two years old before ultimately settling in Garden Grove, California, in 1957 when Blyleven was five years old. One of seven children, his parents anglicized their names to Joe and Jenny, with Rik Aalbert becoming simply "Bert".

He became interested in baseball as a young boy watching Sandy Koufax pitch for the Los Angeles Dodgers and listening to Vin Scully and Jerry Doggett announce the Dodgers' radio broadcasts. Blyleven was quoted as saying, "My dad built me a mound in the backyard with a canvas backdrop over our horseshoe pits, and I would go back there and just throw and throw and throw until I developed it, and it became my curveball. And I could throw it over at any time, any count."

Career
Blyleven starred on the Santiago High School baseball team, also running cross country to build up his stamina and leg strength. After just 21 minor league starts, he found himself called up to the Majors at age 19 on June 2, 1970. In his first season, his sharp curveball helped him to ten victories, and he was named AL Rookie Pitcher of the Year by The Sporting News. In 1973, he pitched nine shutouts, the most of any AL pitcher that season.

However, Blyleven's early career with the Twins was not always pleasant as he was hounded by critics and fans. Unhappy with his salary there, Blyleven was traded (along with teammate Danny Thompson) to the Texas Rangers in a six-player deal on June 1, 1976. He pitched well with the Rangers, posting a 2.76 ERA. On September 22, 1977, just two weeks after being sidelined with a groin injury, Blyleven no-hit the California Angels 6–0 at Anaheim Stadium. The no-hitter was his final start as a Ranger; not until Cole Hamels during the 2015 season would a pitcher be traded after pitching a no-hitter in his most recent start for the team that traded him. His 2.74 career ERA with the Rangers remains the best in team history.

Following an incident in which Blyleven blatantly gave the finger to a television camera obviously focused on him during one of the Rangers' rare nationally broadcast games, he was dealt to the Pittsburgh Pirates in the first four-team blockbuster deal in Major League Baseball history on December 8, 1977, that also involved the Atlanta Braves, New York Mets and a total of 11 players changing teams. The Pirates also acquired John Milner from the Mets. The Rangers received Al Oliver and Nelson Norman from the Pirates and Jon Matlack from the Mets. Adrian Devine, Tommy Boggs and Eddie Miller were traded from the Rangers to the Braves. The Mets got from the Braves Willie Montañez and from the Rangers Tom Grieve and Ken Henderson who was sent to New York to complete the transaction three months later on March 15, 1978. His 20 no decisions in 1979 are the most by an MLB starting pitcher in a season, dating back to at least 1908.

Blyleven became disgruntled with the Pirates and threatened to retire during the  season if he was not traded. The Pirates traded him to the Cleveland Indians on December 9, 1980. He missed a second 20-win season that year when he was forced to miss a couple of starts after breaking his foot when joking around in the bullpen. In  he again led the American League in shutouts with five. That year, he pitched 293.2 innings and completed 24 games, a feat that has not been repeated since. Blyleven was unhappy playing for the lackluster Indians and forced a trade back to the Twins, where he passed the 3,000-strikeout mark and helped the Twins to a 1987 World Series victory.

Blyleven's first two full seasons back with the Twins produced major league records for home runs allowed in a single season (50) and in back-to-back seasons (96). He never surrendered more than 24 home runs in any year before, and after the 1986–87 campaigns, he averaged 21 allowed homers per season over the course of his career.

Blyleven missed the entire  season following rotator cuff surgery. He came back in  but was mostly unproductive, going 8–12 with a 4.74 ERA. He retired following that season with a career 287–250 record with 3,701 strikeouts and a 3.31 ERA. Only 16 other pitchers have at least 3,000 career strikeouts. He pitched for the MLB All-Stars in the 1993 World Port Tournament in Rotterdam.

MLB Hall of Fame third baseman Brooks Robinson said of Blyleven: "[his curveball] was nasty, I'll tell you that. Enough to make your knees buckle. Bert was a terrific pitcher—a dominating pitcher."

Blyleven was a pitching coach for the Netherlands in the 2009 World Baseball Classic. He returned in his role for 2013 and 2017.

Honors

After his first year of Baseball Hall of Fame eligibility in 1998, Blyleven was widely considered to be the best eligible pitcher not yet enshrined. According to Matt Welch of Reason Magazine, "there had long been a strong case that the Dutch-born curveballista was the most deserving player on the outside of Cooperstown looking in." He currently ranks 5th all-time in strikeouts, 9th all-time in shutouts, and 27th all-time in wins. At the time of his election, he was the only eligible member of the 3,000 strikeout club and the only pitcher with 50 or more shutouts not in the Hall of Fame.

Blyleven received only 17.55% of the vote for Hall of Fame admission in 1998 (his first year of eligibility), and his vote total dropped to 14.1% in 1999. No player who had debuted on the ballot since 1970 had a vote total that low and later won election to the Hall. However, ESPN.com columnist Jayson Stark said, "No player has ever—and again, that word is 'ever'—had his Hall of Fame candidacy helped more by the sabermetrics boom than Blyleven." Specifically, according to Welch, "the president and chief investment officer of Lederer & Associates Investment Counsel in Long Beach, California, a guy by the name of Rich Lederer, began spending some of his off-hours writing analysis on the Interwebs about Blyleven's overlooked case."

By 2006, his total had increased to 53.33%. In 2007, Blyleven's total dipped to 47.7% (75% is the minimum required for admission to the Hall). In 2008, he received 336 votes, or 61.9% of the vote. In 2009, he gained only two votes, for a total of 338, 62.7%. In 2010, Blyleven had 74.2% of the votes, missing admission to the Hall of Fame by only 5 votes (0.8%).

Blyleven was inducted to the Hall of Fame in 2011 after receiving 79.7% of the vote on his 14th attempt. "It's been 14 years of praying and waiting," he said on a conference call from Fort Myers, Florida. "I thank the baseball writers of America for, I'm going to say, finally getting it right." Blyleven was the first Dutch-born player inducted, and his Hall of Fame plaque depicts him with a Minnesota Twins cap.

Blyleven was inducted into the Minnesota Twins Hall of Fame in 2002 and was chosen to the fan-elected "Wendy's- Minnesota Twins All-Metrodome Team" on July 28, 2009. On July 16, 2011, the Minnesota Twins formally retired Blyleven's number.

Broadcasting career
In , Blyleven became a television color analyst for the Twins, calling games for WCCO-TV and Midwest Sports Channel (later Fox Sports North). Blyleven's commentary was occasionally risqué for a baseball broadcast but provided interesting and friendly conversation between him and play-by-play announcer Dick Bremer. One of his trademarks was circling fans with the telestrator on screen. Fans—both at home and at road games—carried signs to the games saying "Circle me Bert". This led to a fundraising campaign with the Parkinson's Foundation and a sponsorship with the Minnesota Lottery.

When announcing partner Bremer attempted to circle fans with the telestrator, he drew geometric forms that were non-circular, and Blyleven and fans started to jostle Bremer with phrases like "Rhombus me, Dick" or "Triangle me, Dick".

On September 2, 2020, Blyleven broadcast his final game for the Twins.

Personal life
He currently resides in Fort Myers, Florida.

Blyleven appeared as himself in the 1990 James Belushi film Taking Care of Business. During a 2006 broadcast, Blyleven forgot the name of the movie and had to be reminded of it by a technician in the broadcast booth.

Blyleven was one of baseball's most notorious dugout pranksters during his playing days. He earned the moniker "Frying Dutchman" by frequently setting fire to his teammates' shoelaces, a practical joke known as a "hot foot". During his time with the Angels, the fire extinguisher in the team's clubhouse at Angel Stadium read: "In case of Blyleven: Pull".

Blyleven did not know his correct name until he was about to get married. He had thought all his life his given name was "Rikaalbert". He learned that his name actually was Rik Aalbert Blijleven after obtaining a copy of his birth certificate in order to get married.

Career statistics

See also
3,000 strikeout club
List of Major League Baseball career wins leaders
List of Major League Baseball no-hitters
List of Major League Baseball annual shutout leaders
List of Major League Baseball annual strikeout leaders
List of Texas Rangers Opening Day starting pitchers
List of Major League Baseball career hit batsmen leaders
List of Major League Baseball career shutout leaders
List of Major League Baseball career strikeout leaders

References

External links

BertBlyleven.com, Blyleven's Official Website
BertBelongs.com, a site advocating Blyleven's election into the Baseball Hall of Fame
Baseball Evolution Hall of Fame – Player Profile

June 2, 1976: Minneapolis Tribune column on Blyleven's trade to Texas Rangers
Arguments for inducting Bert Blyleven into the National Baseball Hall of Fame.
Wulf, Steve "Baseball's Dutch Treat" Sports Illustrated, January 28, 1985

1951 births
Living people
American expatriate baseball players in Canada
American League All-Stars
American League strikeout champions
Baseball coaches from California
Baseball players from California
California Angels players
Cleveland Indians players
Dutch emigrants to the United States
Edmonton Trappers players
Evansville Triplets players
Gulf Coast Twins players
Major League Baseball broadcasters
Major League Baseball players from the Netherlands
Major League Baseball players with retired numbers
Major League Baseball pitchers
Midland Angels players
Minnesota Twins announcers
Minnesota Twins players
National Baseball Hall of Fame inductees
Orlando Twins players
People from Garden Grove, California
People from Zeist
Pittsburgh Pirates players
Texas Rangers players
Sportspeople from Utrecht (province)